The 2015 European Junior Curling Challenge was held from January 3 to 9 at the Curling Hall Roztyly in Prague, Czech Republic. Nations in the Europe zone that have not already qualified for the World Junior Curling Championships participated in the curling challenge. The top finishers of each tournament advanced to the 2015 World Junior Curling Championships in Tallinn, Estonia.

Men

Round-robin standings
Final round-robin standings

Playoffs

Quarterfinals
Thursday, January 8, 16:30

Semifinals
Friday, January 9, 9:00

Bronze-medal game
Friday, January 9, 14:30

Gold-medal game
Friday, January 9, 14:30

Women

Teams

Round-robin standings
Final round-robin standings

Round-robin results

Playoffs

Quarterfinals
Thursday, January 8, 20:00

Semifinals
Friday, January 9, 9:00

Bronze-medal game
Friday, January 9, 14:30

Gold-medal game
Friday, January 9, 14:30

References

External links
Official Website
World Curling Federation event page
AllSportDB.com event page

 
2015 in curling
2015 in Czech sport
International curling competitions hosted by the Czech Republic
2015
Sports competitions in Prague